2009 in television may refer to:
 2009 in American television for television related events in the United States.
 2009 in Australian television for television related events in Australia.
 2009 in Belgian television for television related events in Belgium.
 2009 in Brazilian television for television related events in Brazil.
 2009 in British television for television related events in Great Britain.
 2009 in Scottish television for television related events in Scotland.
 2009 in Canadian television for television related events in Canada.
 2009 in Croatian television for television related events in Croatia.
 2009 in Danish television for television related events in Denmark.
 2009 in Dutch television for television related events in the Netherlands.
 2009 in Estonian television for television related events in Estonia.
 2009 in French television for television related events in France.
 2009 in German television for television related events in Germany.
 2009 in Irish television for television related events in Ireland.
 2009 in Italian television for television related events in Italy.
 2009 in Japanese television for television related events in Japan.
 2009 in New Zealand television for television related events in New Zealand.
 2009 in Norwegian television for television related events in Norway.
 2009 in Pakistani television for television related events in Pakistan.
 2009 in Philippine television for television related events in the Philippines.
 2009 in Polish television for television related events in Poland.
 2009 in Portuguese television for television related events in Portugal.
 2009 in South African television for television related events in South Africa.
 2009 in Spanish television for television related events in Spain.
 2009 in Swedish television for television related events in Sweden.

 
Mass media timelines by year